is a Japanese photographer.

References

20th-century Japanese photographers
1946 births
Living people
Place of birth missing (living people)
Date of birth missing (living people)